Bitterns are birds belonging to the subfamily Botaurinae of the heron family Ardeidae. Bitterns tend to be shorter-necked and more secretive than other members of the family. They were called hæferblæte in Old English; the word "bittern" came to English from Old French butor, itself from Gallo-Roman butitaurus, a compound of Latin būtiō (buzzard) and taurus (bull).

Bitterns usually frequent reed beds and similar marshy areas and feed on amphibians, reptiles, insects, and fish.

Bitterns, like herons, egrets, and pelicans, fly with their necks retracted, unlike the similar storks, ibises, and spoonbills, which fly with necks outstretched.

Species 
There are currently 14 species divided into three genera within Botaurinae:

Notes

 

Extant Miocene first appearances
Taxa named by Ludwig Reichenbach